Empire Florizel was a  cargo ship that was built in 1943  by Lithgows, Greenock, Renfrewshire, United Kingdom for the Ministry of War Transport (MoWT). She had a short career, being bombed and sunk during the Allied invasion of Sicily exactly three months after her launch.

Description

The ship was propelled by a 520 nhp  triple expansion steam engine, which had cylinders of 23½ inches (60 cm), 37½ inches (96 cm) and  diameter by  stroke. The engine was built by John Brown & Co. Ltd, Clydebank, Renfrewshire. It drove a single screw propeller.

History
The ship was built in 1943 by Lithgows Ltd, Greenock, Renfrewshire. She was yard number 990. She was launched on 21 April 1943. Her port of registry was Greenock. The Code Letters BFGY andUnited Kingdom Official Number 169503 were allocated. Empire Florizel was operated under the management of J & G Harrison & Co. Ltd., Glasgow, Renfrewshire. Her 48 crew were supplemented by 21 DEMS gunners.

Carrying 4,000 tons of military and invasion stores and fourteen passengers, Empire Florizel made her maiden voyage as a member of Convoy KMS 96G, which departed from the Clyde on 25 June 1943 and passed Gibraltar on 6 July. Redesignated KMS 19, the convoy arrived at Algiers, Algeria on 8 July in preparation for Operation Husky. Redesignated KMS 19Y, the convoy departed from Algiers on 14 July and arrived at Augusta, Sicily, Italy on 20 July. Empire Florizel was bombed and sunk at Augusta on 21 July. Two of her crew, four gunners and three passengers were killed. The two crew members killed are commemorated on the Tower Hill Memorial in London.

References

External links
Photograph of Empire Florizel

1943 ships
Ships built on the River Clyde
Empire ships
Ministry of War Transport ships
Steamships of the United Kingdom
Maritime incidents in July 1943
World War II shipwrecks in the Mediterranean Sea
Cargo ships sunk by aircraft
Ships sunk by German aircraft